St. John is an unincorporated community in Putnam County, in the U.S. state of Missouri.

History
St. John was laid out in 1846 in Section 8 of western Sherman Township. A post office called Saint John was established in 1849, and remained in operation until 1908. A post office in Delpha in section 1 of eastern Sherman Township established in 1891 also closed in 1908. The West Liberty post office also closed in 1908.

References

Unincorporated communities in Putnam County, Missouri
Unincorporated communities in Missouri